TURN (The Utility Reform Network) is a consumer advocacy organization headquartered in San Francisco, California. In 1972, Sylvia Siegel started TURN in her kitchen to represent consumers before the California Public Utilities Commission (CPUC), which she felt was overly focused on the interests of its regulated industries at the expense of consumers. Harry Reasoner interviewed Siegel about her work with TURN on CBS's 60 minutes in 1984.

On January 1, 2008, Mark Toney became the executive director of TURN.  Toney is a Brown University graduate, who later earned his Ph.D. in Sociology at UC Berkeley.  Toney also founded DARE (Direct Action for Rights and Equality) to organize low-income families in Providence, Rhode Island in 1986.

California Governor Jerry Brown appointed former TURN attorney Michael Florio to the California Public Utilities Commission in 2011.

Following the San Bruno pipeline explosion, TURN filed a motion with the CPUC to "compel Pacific Gas and Electric Company to respond to data requests seeking production of documents to determine if PG&E engaged in other efforts to undermine due process in this case."

References

External links
 Historical information about TURN

Consumer organizations in the United States
Non-profit organizations based in California
Organizations based in San Francisco
1972 establishments in California